The 2022–23 Sheikh Russel KC's season is the 15th competitive and 28th overall season in top-flight football since club established in 1995. The season covering period from 8 October 2022 to July 2023.

Players

Transfer

In

Out

Retained

Competitions

Overall

Overview

Premier League

League table

Results summary

Results by round

Matches

Federation Cup

Group stages

Independence Cup

Group stages

Group A

Knockout stages

Goalscorers

Source: Matches

References

Sheikh Russel KC
Football clubs in Bangladesh
1995 establishments in Bangladesh
Bangladeshi football club records and statistics
Sport in Dhaka
2023 in Bangladeshi football
2022 in Bangladeshi football